Uvularization is a secondary articulation of consonants or vowels by which the back of the tongue is constricted toward the uvula and upper pharynx during the articulation of a sound with its primary articulation elsewhere.

IPA symbols
This is specified in VoQS standards.

Occurrence
Uvularized consonants are often not distinguished from pharyngealized consonants, and they may be transcribed as if they were pharyngealized. 

In Arabic and several other Semitic and Berber languages, uvularization is the defining characteristic of the series of "emphatic" coronal consonants.

Other consonants, and vowels, may be phonetically uvularized.
 	
In Greenlandic, long vowels are uvularized before uvular consonants, and English speakers retaining the Northumbrian Burr are reported to both uvularize and retract vowels followed by a rhotic.

References

Phonetics
Uvular consonants
Secondary articulation